Ziad Khalaf al-Karbouly (1970 - died 4 February 2015), a native of Al-Qa'im, was an Islamist former Iraqi officer and the son of an Iraqi tribal sheikh of the Al-Karabla clan of the Dulaim.

Arrest and trial

Al-Karbouly was captured by Jordanian 71st Counter Terrorism Battalion with the aid of Jordanian intelligence officers in May 2006, and accused of being Abu Musab al-Zarqawi's assistant which Karbouly denied. Karbouly told the tribunal that he was “innocent”. He also disputed the prosecution's version that he was captured inside Iraq in a joint operation of the Jordanian army and intelligence on 10 May. He told the tribunal that he was instead kidnapped “from Lebanon on May 6.”

On 23 May 2006, he admitted that he had abducted and killed citizens from Jordan and Iraq, and had abducted two Moroccans in October 2005.

Execution
Al-Karbouly was sentenced to death, and along with failed suicide bomber Sajida Mubarak Atrous al-Rishawi, was hanged on 4 February 2015, expedited in retaliation for the burning of Royal Jordanian Air Force lieutenant Muath al-Kasasbeh by the Islamic State of Iraq and the Levant.

References

2015 deaths
Iraq–Jordan relations
Members of al-Qaeda in Iraq
Iraqi people convicted of murder
Executed Iraqi people
People convicted of murder by Jordan
People convicted on terrorism charges
People executed by Jordan by hanging
21st-century executions by Jordan
Iraqi people executed abroad
People executed for murder
Deaths by hanging
1970 births
2000s murders in Jordan
2006 crimes in Jordan
2006 murders in Asia